Bocet is a form of Romanian folk music.

Bocet is a lament in free rhythm. The bocet is sung by one or more people with their eyes in tears or just expressing a deep grief. Encountered throughout Romania, bocet is a part of the traditional mourning observances.

Romanian music